Stillman Stadium is a stadium in Tuscaloosa, Alabama.  It is primarily used for American football, and is the home field of Stillman Tigers football. 

Stillman Tigers football
College football venues
Sports venues in Tuscaloosa, Alabama
American football venues in Alabama
1999 establishments in Alabama
Sports venues completed in 1999